Margot Loyola Palacios (September 15, 1918 – August 3, 2015) was a musician, folk singer and researcher of the folklore of Chile and Latin America in general.

Loyola was active as a musician and musical ethnographer/anthropologist for many decades. She published a large body of work dealing with musical styles, folk music and customs of all Chilean regions as well as other South American countries. She also taught music.

Early career

Loyola was born in Linares, Chile in 1918. She studied piano with Rosita Renard and Elisa Gayán at the National Conservatory of Music of Chile, and studied song with Blanca Hauser. In 1952 she immersed herself in researching the typical Peruvian dances and musical forms, the marinera and the resbalosa. This allowed her to study the origins of these dances and to characterize the simililarities between the Peruvian and Chilean ones (resfalosa and cueca). Subsequently, she worked with Porfirio Vásquez, the patriarch of black music in Peru, and then went on to study the indigenous culture of Peru with José Maria Arguedas.

Later, Loyola studied Argentine and Uruguayan traditional and folk music, with Carlos Vega and Lauro Ayestarán, respectively. In 1952, she began her celebrated research on the ceremonial dances of the Chilean north, with Rogelia Perez and other musicians and groups. Loyola researched the folklore and traditional musical styles of all the regions of Chile as well as Easter Island (a Chilean province, located in the south Pacific Ocean). She compiled and published a great deal of valuable material obtained from her scholarly research and was regarded as an artist and researcher of great authority. Among the art expressions she researched, some were virtually rescued from oblivion and extinction by her work.

Legacy and recognition
Loyola created Chile's first traditional music and dance group, The Conjunto de Alumnos de Margot Loyola (Student Group of Margot Loyola), through which she effectively became an unofficial ambassadress of the Chilean culture.

In 1972, Loyola became a professor of the University of Chile, and in 1998 she was made a Professor emeritus of the Catholic University of Valparaíso. She was awarded the coveted Chilean National Prize for Musical Arts in 1994 and the "Premio a lo Chileno" in 2001. She died on August 3, 2015 at the age of 96 in Santiago de Chile.

Works
Loyola's activities resulted in several books, videos, LPs, cassettes and CDs.

Bibliography
 "Bailes de tierra" (Earth dances), (1980)
 "El Cachimbo", (1994)

Videography

 "Danzas tradicionales de Chile" (Traditional dances of Chile), (1994)
 "La Zamacueca" (1999)
 "Los del Estribo: Cantos y Danzas Populares de Chile", (2001)

Discography
 14 LPs, 6 cassettes and 7 CDs, in addition to other editions in various other countries

Notes

1918 births
2015 deaths
Chilean folk singers
20th-century Chilean women singers
University of Chile alumni
Academic staff of the University of Chile
Academic staff of the Pontifical Catholic University of Valparaíso
Chilean guitarists
Chilean singer-songwriters
Chilean people of Basque descent
People from Linares
Chilean folklorists
Women folklorists
Women in Latin music